Enzo Marcelo Salas (born 7 September 2000) is an Argentine professional footballer who plays as a forward for Academia Mascherano.

Career
After spells with Comunicaciones Concordia and Club Salto Grande, Salas played in the youth system of Gimnasia y Esgrima up until 2016 as he moved to Temperley. His breakthrough into their first-team came three years later during the 2018–19 Primera B Nacional campaign, with his first taste of senior football coming when he was an unused substitute for a fixture with Sarmiento in February 2019. Salas' professional bow arrived on 20 April, with Cristian Aldirico picking him off the bench after seventy-six minutes of a 1–1 draw with Platense.

Career statistics
.

References

External links

2000 births
Living people
People from Concordia, Entre Ríos
Sportspeople from Entre Ríos Province
Argentine footballers
Association football forwards
Primera Nacional players
Club Atlético Temperley footballers